John Carr (1722–1807) was a County Durham born schoolmaster and writer.

Cuthbert Sharp, in his "The Bishoprick Garland” of 1834 and many other sources give the dates as 1732-1807 and age 75 at the time of his death

Early life 
John Carr LL.D. was born in Muggleswick, County Durham in 1722  (or 1732 - see above).

He was the son of a local farmer and was educated firstly at the village school and privately by the local curate Rev Daniel Watson, then later at St Paul’s School where he remained longer than most as his parents could not afford a place at University.

He became a master at Hertford Grammar School and eventually received a degree of LL.D. from Marischal College, Aberdeen

Later life
He died on 6 June 1807 after an illness lasting almost a year and was buried in St. John’s church, Hertford. On the headstone is an epitaph in Latin, written by himself.

Family
His father and mother were William and Ann Carr. He had a younger brother Joseph, who became the Rev. Joseph Carr who died in Allenheads, Northumberland 27 April 1806 aged 60 years.  He also had a brother, William T. Carr, to whom he dedicated a poem in his 1807 edition.

John Carr was married (wife's name unknown), but his wife predeceased him.

Legacy
Possibly his main legacy is his "Translation of Lucian" from ancient Greek language, on which he spent almost 25 years from  1773 to 1798. This was published in 5 volumes. At the time it was considered to be of great importance in the literary world, but this importance has since diminished with the appearance of other more classical translations.

Other works
Dr. Carr considered his other works to be mere trifles on which he set little value. These included :-
 Vol. III of Tristram Shandy – an imitation of the original by Laurence Sterne M.A., 1760
 "Filial Piety" a mock heroic, 1763
 Extract of a Private Letter to a Critic, 1764
 Eponi-na, a Dramatic Essay, addressed to the ladies, 1765
 Ode to the River Derwent – with its 40 verses. This appears in The Bishoprick Garland of 1834 by Sir Cuthbert Sharp

See also 
Geordie dialect words
Cuthbert Sharp
The Bishoprick Garland 1834 by Sharp

References

External links
  Chalmers Biography vol. 8, p. 281
 The Bishoprick Garland
  Literary Anecdotes of the Eighteenth Century volume VIII by John Nichols
 Bibliotheca Britannia by Robert Watt M.D. 1824 – page 196

1722 births
1807 deaths
18th-century English non-fiction writers
18th-century English male writers
18th-century English writers
English dramatists and playwrights
English male poets
English translators
Geordie songwriters
People from County Durham (district)
Burials in Hertfordshire
English male dramatists and playwrights
English male non-fiction writers
18th-century British translators